Cochliolepis is a genus of small sea snails, marine gastropod mollusks in the family Tornidae.

Taxonomy
Rolán & Rubio (2002: 46) hold Discopsis as a valid genus, distinct from Cochliolepis Stimpson, 1858, on the grounds that the latter belongs in the family Vitrinellidae and the former in Tornidae. This should be reevaluated in the perspective that both families are considered synonyms. Adam & Knudsen (1969) may have been right in placing the West African species in Cochliolepis.

Species
Species within the genus Cochliolepis include:
 Cochliolepis adamsii (P. Fischer, 1857)
 Cochliolepis albiceratus Ponder, 1966
 Cochliolepis catherinae Barnard, 1963
 † Cochliolepis differens Rubio, Rolán & Lee, 2011 
 Cochliolepis holmesii (Dall, 1889)
 Cochliolepis militaris (Jousseaume, 1872)
 Cochliolepis nautiliformis (Holmes, 1859)
 Cochliolepis parasitica Stimpson, 1858
 Cochliolepis patricioi Rubio, Rolán & Lee, 2011
 Cochliolepis planispiralis Rubio, Fernández-Garcés & Rolán, 2011
 Cochliolepis planulata (G.B. Sowerby III, 1892)
 Cochliolepis striata Dall, 1889
 Cochliolepis surinamensis Van Regteren Altena, 1966
 Cochliolepis tugelae Barnard, 1963 
 Species brought into synonymy
 Cochliolepis albicerata Ponder, 1966 : synonym of Cochliolepis albiceratus Ponder, 1966
 Cochliolepis antarctica Numanami, 1996: synonym of Zerotula antarctica (Numanami, 1996)
 Cochliolepis costulatus (de Folin, 1870): synonym of Discopsis costulatus de Folin, 1870
 Cochliolepis dautzenbergi Adam & Knudsen, 1969: synonym of Discopsis dautzenbergi (Adam & Knudsen, 1969)
 Cochliolepis gruveli (Dautzenberg, 1912): synonym of Discopsis gruveli (Dautzenberg, 1912
 Cochliolepis jullieni Adam & Knudsen, 1969: synonym of Discopsis jullieni (Adam & Knudsen, 1969)
 Cochliolepis radians Rolán & Rubio, 1991: synonym of Discopsis radians (Rolán & Rubio, 1991)
 Cochliolepis reductus Rolán & Rubio, 1991: synonym of Discopsis reductus (Rolán & Rubio, 1991)

References

 Stimpson W. (1858). A new form of parasitic gasteropodous Mollusca, called Cochliolepis parasiticus. Proceedings of the Boston Society of Natural History 6: 307-309
 Rubio, F.; Fernández-Garcés, R.; Rolán, E. (2011). The family Tornidae (Gastropoda, Rissooidea) in the Caribbean and neighboring areas. Iberus. 29(2), 1-230

External links
 To World Register of Marine Species

 
Tornidae